Pern Pak Chong Football Club (Thai ทีมฟุตบอล สโมสร เพื่อนปากช่อง), is a Thai football club based in Pak Chong District in Nakhon Ratchasima, Thailand. The club is currently playing in the Thai Football Division 3.

Record

References

External links
 

Association football clubs established in 2016
Football clubs in Thailand
Nakhon Ratchasima province
2016 establishments in Thailand